Lugenbeel may refer to:

Lugenbeel County, South Dakota, a former county in South Dakota, United States
James W. Lugenbeel (1819–1857), American physician
Pinkney Lugenbeel (1819–1886), United States Army officer